Yevgeny Mikhaylovich Khritonov (born 4 October 1946) is a Russian agronomist and politician.  He has served as governor of Krasnodar Krai in 1994–1996.

In 1971, Kharitonov graduated from the Kuban Agricultural Institute as an agronomist. Since 1973 he was a Communist Party functionary, holding senior positions in Labinsky and Kurganinsky Districts of Krasnodar Krai.

In 1991–94 he was the head of Kurganinsky District administration. From August 1994 to July 1996 Kharitonov was the governor of Krasnodar Krai. After he was removed from office by president Boris Yeltsin, he participated in the election of October 1996. Kharitonov finished fifth with 2% of the vote.

From 1996 to 1998 he was a vice-chancellor of the Kuban State Agrarian University. In 1998-2015 he headed the All-Russian Research Institute of Rice.

References 

1946 births
Living people
People from Kurganinsky District
Communist Party of the Soviet Union members
Our Home – Russia politicians
20th-century Russian politicians
Governors of Krasnodar Krai
Members of the Federation Council of Russia (1996–2000)